Norman Cousins (June 24, 1915 – November 30, 1990) was an American political journalist, author, professor, and world peace advocate.

Early life
Cousins was born to Jewish immigrant parents Samuel Cousins and Sarah Babushkin Cousins, in West Hoboken, New Jersey (which later became Union City). At age 11, he was misdiagnosed with tuberculosis and placed in a sanatorium. Despite this, he was an athletic youth, and he claimed that as a young boy he "set out to discover exuberance."

Cousins attended Theodore Roosevelt High School in the Bronx, New York City, graduating on February 3, 1933. He edited the high school paper, "The Square Deal," where his editing abilities were already in evidence. Cousins received a bachelor's degree from Teachers College, Columbia University, in New York City.

His sister Jean married Tom Middleton.

Career
He joined the staff of the New York Evening Post (now the New York Post) in 1934, and in 1935 was hired by Current History as a book critic. He later ascended to the position of managing editor. He also befriended the staff of the Saturday Review of Literature (later renamed Saturday Review), which had its offices in the same building, and by 1940, joined the staff of that publication as well. He was named editor-in-chief in 1942, a position he would hold until 1972. Under his direction, circulation of the publication increased from 20,000 to 650,000.

Cousins's philosophy toward his work was exemplified by his instructions to his staff "not just to appraise literature, but to try to serve it, nurture it, safeguard it." Cousins believed that "there is a need for writers who can restore to writing its powerful tradition of leadership in crisis."  He was a lifetime believer in the power of hope. "Is it only in my imagination," writes Sarah Shapiro in "An Audience of One," [Mosaica Press 2021] "that you said, 'Optimism is realism,' or was that a principle you nonverbally imparted?" Cousins had no patience for those who consciously bend truth, whether for personal expediency or in the political sphere. The integrity of words, in speech and in writing, was sacred to him. "To the best of my knowledge," writes Shapiro, "you did not lie. You found lying repugnant, beneath human dignity....Gossip bounced off of you; it would not stick....In all my life, you never broke a promise. A man of your word, literally." For Cousins, the honest use of words was an absolute value and the distinguishing mark of the human being.

One of his well-known lines, "Life is an adventure in forgiveness," has survived him.

Cousins joined the University of California, Los Angeles faculty in 1978 and became an adjunct professor in the Department of Psychiatry and Biobehavioral Sciences. He taught ethics and medical literature. His research interest was the connection between attitude and health.

Shapiro, who worked there as a college student, wrote (about her father) that, based on what the head of SR's advertising department told her, Cousins, in 30 years as editor of Saturday Review, "had never fired anyone."

Political views and activism
Politically, Cousins was a tireless advocate of liberal causes, such as nuclear disarmament and world peace, which he promoted through his writings in Saturday Review. In a 1984 forum at the University of California, Berkeley, titled "Quest for Peace", Cousins recalled the long editorial he wrote on August 6, 1945, the day the United States dropped the atomic bomb in Hiroshima. Titled "The Modern Man is Obsolete", Cousins, who stated that he felt "the deepest guilt" over the bomb's use on human beings, discussed in the editorial the social and political implications of the atomic bomb and nuclear power. He rushed to get it published the next day in the Review, and the response was considerable, as it was reprinted in newspapers around the country and enlarged into a book that was reprinted in different languages.

Following the 1962 Cuban missile crisis, President John F. Kennedy saw that only he could find the terms that would be accepted by Nikita Khrushchev to avert nuclear war. Both sides used unofficial intermediaries to relay messages back and forth outside the usual diplomatic routes. For example Kennedy used Norman Cousins, who was well appreciated in Moscow for his leadership of SANE, the Committee for a SANE Nuclear Policy.  This helped the two leaders forge the highly successful Limited Test Ban Treaty of 1963.

Despite his role as an advocate of liberalism, he jokingly expressed opposition to women entering the workforce.  In 1939, upon learning that the number of women in the workforce was close to the number of unemployed males, he offered this solution: "Simply fire the women, who shouldn't be working anyway, and hire the men. Presto! No unemployment. No relief rolls. No depression."

In the 1950s, Cousins played a prominent role in bringing the Hiroshima Maidens, a group of twenty-five Hibakusha, to the United States for medical treatment.

In the 1960s, he began the American-Soviet Dartmouth Conferences for peace process.

Cousins also wrote a collection of non-fiction books on the same subjects, such as the 1953 Who Speaks for Man? , which advocated a World Federation and nuclear disarmament. He also served as president of the World Federalist Association and chairman of the Committee for Sane Nuclear Policy, which in the 1950s warned that the world was bound for a nuclear holocaust if the threat of the nuclear arms race was not stopped. Cousins became an unofficial ambassador in the 1960s, and his facilitating communication between the Holy See, the Kremlin, and the White House helped lead to the Soviet-American test ban treaty, for which he was thanked by President John F. Kennedy and Pope John XXIII; the Pope also awarded him his personal medallion. Cousins was also awarded the Eleanor Roosevelt Peace Award in 1963, the Family Man of the Year Award in 1968, the United Nations Peace Medal in 1971, and the Niwano Peace Prize and the Albert Schweitzer Prize for Humanitarianism, both in 1990. He also served on the board of trustees for Science Service, now known as Society for Science & the Public, from 1972 to 1975.

Illness, laugh therapy and recovery
Cousins did research on the biochemistry of human emotions, which he long believed were the key to human beings' success in fighting illness. It was a belief he maintained even as he battled in 1964 a sudden-onset case of a crippling connective tissue disease, which was also referred to as a collagen disease. Experts at Dr. Rusk's rehabilitation clinic confirmed this diagnosis and added a diagnosis of ankylosing spondylitis. Told that he had one chance in 500 of recovery, Cousins developed his own recovery program. He took massive intravenous doses of Vitamin C and had self-induced bouts of laughter brought on by films of the television show Candid Camera and by various comic films. His positive attitude was not new to him, however. He had always been an optimist, known for his kindness to others, and his robust love of life itself. "I made the joyous discovery that ten minutes of genuine belly laughter had an anesthetic effect and would give me at least two hours of pain-free sleep," he reported. "When the pain-killing effect of the laughter wore off, we would switch on the motion picture projector again and not infrequently, it would lead to another pain-free interval." His struggle with that illness and his discovery of laugh therapy is detailed in his 1979 book Anatomy of an Illness as Perceived by the Patient.

In a commentary questioning whether Cousins cured his disease, Florence Ruderman wrote, "It seems entirely possible that what Cousins had was an acute attack of an arthritic condition which then subsided, slowly, but quite naturally."

Later in life, he and his wife, Ellen, together fought his heart disease, again with exercise, a daily regimen of vitamins, and the good nutrition provided by Ellen's organic garden. He wrote a collection of best-selling non-fiction books on illness and healing, as well as a 1980 autobiographical memoir, Human Options: An Autobiographical Notebook.

Movie portrayal
Cousins was portrayed by actor Ed Asner in a 1984 television movie, Anatomy of an Illness, which was based on Cousins's 1979 book Anatomy of an Illness as Perceived by the Patient: Reflections on Healing.  Cousins was not pleased with the commercial nature of the movie, nor with Hollywood's sensationalistic exaggerations of his experience. He and other members of the Cousins family were also taken aback by the casting of Asner, owing to the fact that the two men bore scant physical resemblance to each other. But Asner tried faithfully, Cousins felt, to convey the spirit of his subject, and once the film was completed, Cousins was said by Asner to look upon the movie with a certain degree of tolerance, if not delight.

Death
Cousins died of heart failure on November 30, 1990, in Los Angeles, having survived years longer than his doctors predicted: 10 years after his first heart attack, 26 years after his collagen illness, and 36 years after his doctors first diagnosed his heart disease.

He and his wife, Ellen, raised four children: Dr. Andrea Cousins of Northampton, Massachusetts; the now deceased Amy Cousins; Dr. Candis Cousins Kerns of Oakland, California; and writer Sarah Shapiro of Jerusalem, Israel. He is survived by his children and by 26 grandchildren and is buried at the Mt. Lebanon Jewish Cemetery in New Jersey alongside his wife and his parents, Samuel Cousins and Sara Miller Cousins.

An obituary containing further information, mainly of his writing and editing career, was published by the December 2, 1990, edition of The New York Times, a day after his death was reported.

See also
List of peace activists
White Light/Black Rain: The Destruction of Hiroshima and Nagasaki (2007)

Selected works
 Modern Man Is Obsolete (1945)
 Writing for Love or Money: Thirty-Five Essays Reprinted from The Saturday Review of Literature (1949)
 Who Speaks for Man? (1953)
 "In God We Trust"; The Religious Beliefs and Ideas of the American Founding Fathers (1958)
 Dr. Schweitzer of Lambaréné (1960)
 In Place of Folly (1962)
 Present Tense; an American Editor's Odyssey (1967)
 Great American Essays (1967)
 Improbable Triumvirate: John F. Kennedy, Pope John, Nikita Khrushchev (1972) 
 The Celebration of Life; A Dialogue on Immortality and Infinity (1974) 
 Anatomy of an Illness as Perceived by the Patient: Reflections on Healing and Regeneration (1979) 
 Human Options: An Autobiographical Notebook (1981) 
 La volonté de guérir (1981) 
 The Physician in Literature (1982) 
 The Healing Heart: Antidotes to Panic and Helplessness (1983) 
 The Words of Albert Schweitzer (Words of Series) (1984) 
 Albert Schweitzer's Mission: Healing and Peace (1985) with Schweitzer 
 Nobel Prize Conversations: With Sir John Eccles, Roger Sperry, Ilya Prigogine, Brian Josephson (1985) 
 The Human Adventure: A Camera Chronicle (1986) 
 The Pathology of Power (1987) 
 The Republic of Reason: The Personal Philosophies of the Founding Fathers (1988) 
 Master Photographs: Master Photographs From PFA Exhibitions 1959-67 (1988) 
 Head First: The Biology of Hope and the Healing Power of the Human Spirit (1989) 
 Mind Over Illness (1991) 
 Why Man Explores (2005)

Awards
Cousins received the inaugural Helmerich Award in 1985. The Peggy V. Helmerich Distinguished Author Award is presented annually by the Tulsa Library Trust.

Notes

References
Allen Pietrobon, Norman Cousins: Peacemaker in the Atomic Age (Johns Hopkins Nuclear History and Contemporary Affairs), Johns Hopkins University Press, 2022. 
The Union City Reporter; January 12, 2006. "Native Sons and Daughters: Prominent author, peace advocate Norman Cousins Lived Here" by Jessica Rosero.

External links

Annotated Bibliography for Norman Cousins from the Alsos Digital Library for Nuclear Issues
 Why This Man Matters: Norman Cousins
 Interview about his contacts with Nikita Khushchev for the WGBH series, War and Peace in the Nuclear Age
 Transcript, Norman Cousins Talks on Positive Emotions and Health, 1983 – From an address given in Santa Monica, CA and subsequently broadcast over public radio.
 
 
 
 
 Key Participants: Norman Cousins – Linus Pauling and the International Peace Movement: A Documentary History

1915 births
1990 deaths
People from Union City, New Jersey
American anti-war activists
American health and wellness writers
American male journalists
American literary critics
American magazine editors
Teachers College, Columbia University alumni
Jewish American writers
Writers from New Jersey
Writers from New York City
New York Post people
World federalist activists
American anti–nuclear weapons activists
20th-century American non-fiction writers
20th-century American male writers
University of California, Los Angeles faculty
20th-century American Jews